The French women's national under 18 ice hockey team is the national under-18 ice hockey team in France. The team is organized by the Fédération Française de Hockey sur Glace (FFHG), a member of the International Ice Hockey Federation (IIHF).

Women's World U18 Championship record

^Includes one win in extra time (in the round robin)
*Includes one loss in extra time (in the round robin)

Team

Current roster
Roster for the 2023 IIHF World Women's U18 Championship Division I Group A, played 9 to 15 January 2023 in Ritten, Italy.

Head coach: Baptiste ArpinAssistant coaches: Miroslav Kečka, Franck Constantin (goaltender)

References

Women's national under-18 ice hockey teams
National youth sports teams of France